The Civic may refer to:

 The Civic, Christchurch, an historic building in Christchurch, New Zealand
 The Civic, Barnsley, a theatre and art gallery in Barnsley, Yorkshire, UK
Civic Theatre (disambiguation), several theatres